San Rafael Airport ,  is an airport serving Los Andes, a city in the Valparaíso Region of Chile.

It is the base of operations for the Latin American Aviation Training flight school.

The airport is within a mountain basin, and there is distant mountainous terrain in all quadrants.

See also

Transport in Chile
List of airports in Chile

References

External links
OpenStreetMap - San Rafael
OurAirports - San Rafael
FallingRain - San Rafael Airport

Airports in Chile
Airports in Valparaíso Region